Joseph de Bruyn  (born 10 September 1949), is an Australian trade union official. He is National President of the Shop, Distributive and Allied Employees Association (SDA) and a member of the National Executive of the Australian Labor Party (ALP).

De Bruyn served as the SDA's National Secretary from 1978 to 2014. He is currently the National President

Early life and education
De Bruyn was born in Roosendaal in the Netherlands in 1949. He migrated to Australia with his parents at the age of seven in 1956, and grew up in rural Victoria. He obtained a Bachelor of Agricultural Science from the University of Melbourne, and went on to study for a PhD in agricultural economics at the University of Sydney but did not complete the degree. He is married with four children, and lives in Melbourne, Victoria.

Political career

Australian trade union movement and Labor
As the national head of the SDA, de Bruyn has considerable influence in Australian trade union and political affairs. This is particularly so in Labor as delegations to the various State and Territory bodies that control party policy and pre-selections for State and Federal Parliaments are decided on a pro-rata basis of union members affiliated to the party.

De Bruyn strongly supported the ACTU's 'Rights at Work' campaign against the Howard Government's industrial relations laws passed in 2005. The union is a significant contributor to Labor election campaigns, according to Australian Electoral Commission funding disclosure returns.

Liberal MP Eric Abetz is quoted as saying "Joe de Bruyn is a role model of trade union officialdom. He is the type of official that gives trade unionism a good name."

Catholic conservative
The SDA is associated with the Labor Right, Labor Unity or Centre-Unity grouping or faction of the trade union movement and the Australian Labor Party. It also has a long-established reputation as a supporter of conservative Catholic parliamentarians. De Bruyn, himself a Catholic, is a leading figure in the right wing faction of the trade union movement and the Australian Labor Party. De Bruyn has come under scrutiny for voicing his socially conservative views while being secretary of a trade union and holding a position on the National Executive of Labor, a centre-left political party. He has repeatedly voiced opposition to abortion, and to legalising same sex marriage.

In response to a 2014 poll with 72 percent support for same-sex marriage, de Bruyn dismissed the figures but refused to poll his members on the issue. He says he "knows they agree with him absolutely. When we talk to our members about out these things they agree with us".

At a quarterly SDA members meeting in February 2011, de Bruyn moved a resolution against gay marriage, without giving any members a chance to speak or vote on the issue. This led to the first instance of members of the SDA speaking out and challenging de Bruyn on his stance on gay marriage. Speaking at an AWU event in 2003, former Labor Prime Minister Gough Whitlam quipped that "Joe de Bruyn is a Dutchman who hates dykes."

Honours
In 2022, de Bruyn was appointed Officer of the Order of Australia in the 2022 Queen's Birthday Honours for "distinguished service to industrial relations, particularly the trade union sector, for superannuation reform, and to higher education".

References

1949 births
Australian people of Dutch descent
Australian Roman Catholics
Australian trade unionists
Living people
Officers of the Order of Australia
University of Melbourne alumni